Sir Robert Fagg (or Fagge), 4th Baronet  (1704–1740), of Wiston, near Steyning, Sussex, was a British politician who sat in the House of Commons from 1734 to 1740.

Fagg was baptized on 20 September 1704, the third but only surviving son of Sir Robert Fagg, 3rd Baronet, of Wiston and his wife Christian Bishopp, daughter of Sir Cecil Bishopp, 4th Baronet,  MP  of Parham, Sussex. He married   Sarah Ward, daughter of William Ward, MD  of York in  1729.
 
At the 1734 British general election, Fagg stood for Steyning, where his father had twice been unsuccessful. He ran with the Marquess of Carnarvon, whose father, the 1st Duke of Chandos, favoured the arrangement and they were both returned as MPs.  Fagg voted with the Opposition against the Spanish convention in 1739, and for the place bill in 1740.

Fagg  succeeded his father in the baronetcy  on 22 June 1736. He died without issue on 14 September 1740, and was succeeded in the baronetcy by his cousin William. He left the family estates to his sister Elizabeth, who afterwards married Sir Charles Goring, 5th Baronet, son of Sir Henry Goring.

References

1704 births
1740 deaths
British MPs 1734–1741
Members of the Parliament of Great Britain for English constituencies
Baronets in the Baronetage of England
People from Wiston, West Sussex